Dáibhí Ó Bruadair (1625 – January 1698) was one of the most significant Irish language poets of the 17th century. He lived through a momentous time in Irish history and his work serves as testimony to the death of the old Irish cultural and political order and the decline in respect for the once honoured and feared poetic classes. His ode, D'Aithle Na bhFileadh (The High Poets are Gone) upon the death of a fellow poet is a particularly poignant reminder of this decline and lament that Ireland was now a far less educated place due to it.

Biography
He was born  in Barrymore, County Cork  and spent much of his adult life in Limerick, receiving the patronage of both Irish and Anglo-Irish landowners. This patronage was vital, as Ó Bruadair was the first of the 17th-century poets to attempt to live purely from his poetry, in the manner of the professional bards of the medieval period. It would seem that this attempt was not particularly successful, as his poem Is mairg nár chrean le maitheas saoghalta indicates that he was reduced to working as a farm labourer. He died in poverty and, as poems such as Mairg nach fuil 'na Dhubhthuata (O It's best be a total boor) show, with bitterness on him towards the 'blind ignorant crew' that was the peasantry. This view was reflected by other poets such as Brian Mac Giolla Phádraig.

As well as Irish, Ó Bruadair knew Latin and English. He was a poet of considerable range, and wrote on historical and political subjects, as well as producing elegies on a number of his patrons, bitter satires on Cromwellian planters, religious poems of real feeling and, almost uniquely amongst Gaelic poets, at least two epithalamia. His versification was equally varied, and he wrote in both syllabic and assonantal metres.

Bibliography

Notes

External links
Biographical note
Brief Biography at Ricorso
RTÉ Radio 1, Scríbhneoirí Faoi Chaibidil
 entry in ainm.ie (in Irish)

1625 births
1698 deaths
People from County Cork
17th-century Irish people
Irish poets
Irish-language poets